The La Pêche River is a river in western Quebec, in Canada, which drains La Pêche Lake (Lac La Pêche) in Gatineau Park and empties into the Gatineau River at Wakefield.

Geography 

La Pêche Lake receives water discharges of several lakes (to the west and north), including: Martin, Serpent, à Guilbeault, Fisher, Trois Monts, Malverson, du Loup and La Loutre. The mouth of La Pêche Lake is at its northern end.

La Pêche river flows towards the north-east, then east, where it will run along more or less the 366 West Main Road to its mouth. On its way to the east, La Pêche River collects various branches dumps lakes:
 South side - Branch of Eardley, including lakes: Ben, Hawley, Blind, Ramsay, Kidder, Gervais, Richard and Leblanc;
 South side - Branch of "chemin du lac-Philipe" (Road of Lake-Philipe), including lakes: Racine, Monette and Kingbury;
 North side - Outlet of lake Gingras.
 North side - Branch of Kennedy Road, particularly lakes: Gauvreau, Jean-Venne, Anderson and Kennedy;
 North side - Branch of "chemin Horace-Cross" (Road Horace-Cross), particularly lakes: Wills, Fraser and Bell.

Toponymy 
At the beginning of the 19th century, Joseph Bureau, among other explorers, described this lake as a very fishy lake, abounding especially pike and trout. Accessibility of La Pêche Lake, near the Ottawa River and Ottawa city, in (Ontario), favoured sport fishing.

The toponym "La Pêche River" was recorded as of December 24, 1976, at the "Bank of place names" in Commission de toponymie du Québec (Geographical Names Board of Québec). The toponyms of the lake and river are related together.

History 
A grain mill was built in 1838 on the river at MacLaren Falls near Wakefield and is now operated as an inn, the Moulin Wakefield Inn and Spa. A textile mill and a sawmill at the same location helped to provide the impetus for the development of a settlement at Wakefield.

See also 
 List of Quebec rivers
 Les Collines-de-l'Outaouais Regional County Municipality

References 

Rivers of Outaouais
Tributaries of the Gatineau River